Call of Duty: Finest Hour is a first-person shooter video game developed by Spark Unlimited and published by Activision for GameCube, PlayStation 2, and Xbox. It is the first console installment of Call of Duty.

Although it is based on the original Call of Duty for Microsoft Windows, it has a different storyline and acts as a side-story of the main game. It features six intertwined stories and battles based on real events from the perspective of soldiers on each side of the allied campaign (U.S., British, and Soviet).

The game's music was composed by Michael Giacchino, who previously worked on the original Call of Duty and the Medal of Honor franchise. AC/DC singer Brian Johnson provides the voice of Sergeant Starkey, one of the British commandos.

Multiplayer
Finest Hour can support both online and local multi-player support, depending on the console. It had no online multi-player support for the GameCube as it does not take advantage of the GameCube broadband or modem adapter. On the Xbox, Finest Hour had Xbox Live support and up to 32 players can play locally through Xbox's System Link feature. The PlayStation 2 port of Finest Hour also had PS2 Online support, with up to 16 players per session.

Plot

Eastern front
In the Soviet campaign, the player first controls Private Aleksandr Sokolov. Sokolov participates in The Battle of Stalingrad following Sergeant Oleg Puskov. The sergeant is eventually killed by a sniper, sacrificing himself to save Sokolov. A female Soviet sniper, named Tanya Pavelovna appears and shoots the German sniper, then sends Sokolov on a mission to liberate Mamayev Kurgan hill. After the mission is completed, Sokolov becomes Pavelovna's spotter as the two work to harass the Germans. Pavelovna and Sokolov navigate through the sewers to help defend a tractor factory to ensure the safety of a T-34, supervised by Major Nikolai Badanov. In the tank, the major fights his way to General Belov's headquarters. Nikolai has orders from Belov to deliver a radio to a spotter team at the train station in order to coordinate a Katyusha rocket barrage on German armor. Afterward, Badanov is involved in the Soviet assault on a German airfield at Tatsinskaya, codenamed Operation Little Saturn. Nikolai and other T-34s proceed to the airstrip to destroy German aircraft. Upon destroying the airfield they meet up with more Soviets to assault the German headquarter's air traffic control.

North Africa
The British campaign follows Edward Carlyle. Carlyle embarks on a night raid in Matmata with a commando team led by Sergant Starkey to storm a German fortress and destroy a fuel depot. After the Matmata raid, Starkey and Carlyle evacuate in a jeep. By daybreak Starkey drives through German infested roads, while Carlyle mans the 50. Cal machine gun. Eventually Carlyle and Starkey make it to a besieged British fort, where they rescue Sergeant Dehart and a cartographer and ultimately neutralize the German presence in the fort.

Western Front
The American campaign follows Sergeant Chuck Walker. The first three missions concentrate on the capture of Aachen, with Chuck protecting the tank column along the way. After the capture of Aachen, the story shifts focus to M4 Sherman tank commander Sam Rivers, a young African-American who fends off Germans around the town of Tillet. After that, the newly promoted Lieutenant Walker infiltrates the city of Remagen to scout the Ludendorff Bridge and escort Rivers' tank squad to the bridge. Upon reaching the bridge, a huge hole in the ground prevents the tanks from moving on. Chuck eliminates the German garrison, delivering the bridge into Allied hands, so they can push into Germany.

Reception

By July 2006, the PlayStation 2 version of Finest Hour had sold 1.2 million copies and earned $45 million in the United States. Next Generation ranked it as the 41st highest-selling game launched for the PlayStation 2, Xbox or GameCube between January 2000 and July 2006 in that country. Combined sales of Call of Duty console games reached 4 million units in the United States by July 2006. The PlayStation 2 version also received a "Platinum" sales award from the Entertainment and Leisure Software Publishers Association (ELSPA), indicating sales of at least 300,000 copies in the United Kingdom.

Finest Hour received mixed to positive reviews. IGN states that despite its portrayal of a good shooter, it is still stuck between realism and over-the-top antics, the graphics have been criticized as being very ordinary along with the effects being disappointing and the sound was also found to be out of place in some areas of the game.

References

External links

2004 video games
Activision games
Finest Hour
Multiplayer online games
GameCube games
PlayStation 2 games
World War II first-person shooters
Video games about Nazi Germany
Video games featuring female protagonists
Video games scored by Michael Giacchino
Video games set in Belgium
Video games set in Germany
Video games set in the Soviet Union
Video games set in Russia
Video games set in Tunisia
Xbox games
Multiplayer and single-player video games
RenderWare games
BAFTA winners (video games)
Video games developed in the United States